Langford Baker (29 March 1879 – 20 May 1964) was an English professional footballer who played as an inside forward. He played for Lowestoft Town in the 1900 final of the FA Amateur Cup.

References

1879 births
1964 deaths
People from Lowestoft
English footballers
Association football inside forwards
Lowestoft North End F.C. players
Lowestoft Harriers F.C. players
Lowestoft Town F.C. players
Grimsby Town F.C. players
Norwich City F.C. players
East Halton Rovers F.C. players
English Football League players